Joshua Barber (born  1977) is an American artist living and working in Richmond, Virginia.

Work 
Barber is best known for his modern icons, which he began painting in 2000 after a three-week trip to Jerusalem, Egypt and Jordan. Stylized figures on hand-weathered paper and wood, often embellished with gold leaf, recalled the religious artwork and the Dead Sea Scrolls Barber saw on his travels. Recent exhibitions of this work include the "Five Books" solo show (May 2005), consisting of 70 paintings interpreting verses from the Pentateuch of the Old Testament, and "Modern Icons," a collection of 20 paintings exhibited in a solo show at the Rainbow Café, Bristol, England (October 2007).

Barber also paints landscapes and abstract pieces distinguished by muted pastels, the use of acrylic with oil and pencil details. One of his landscapes, a depiction of the Vice President’s Residence at the United States Naval Observatory, was selected as the official Vice President’s 2004 holiday card.

Barber is represented by Tunnadine Fine Art in the United Kingdom, represents himself as Joshua Barber Fine Art in the United States and Richmond, Virginia.

Biography 
Barber was born in Richmond, Virginia. His father is John Barber, an acclaimed maritime artist. Joshua Barber paints modern-day icons and stylized landscapes. His multimedia work marries rough, tactile lines with delicate details. Joshua’s paintings have been exhibited in galleries in the United Kingdom, New York, Los Angeles and Richmond, as well as in the Dreweatts Urban Art Auction in London. Joshua is a board member of Art on Wheels and volunteers as an art instructor for children with cancer and their siblings through Connor’s Heroes. Joshua Barber received his BFA cum laude in 2000 from Appalachian State University.

Exhibitions and Honors 

2018 
August  –  December: 6 East Broad Street “First Friday Exhibit”  – Richmond, VA
September: Saint Francis Home, Live and Silent Auction  – Richmond, VA

2017 
February – May: “Wish you were here Art Show” – Fountain Street Fine Art Gallery – Framingham, Massachusetts
January: Nansemond-Suffolk Academy Art Show – Norfolk, Virginia

2016 
November: Comfort Zone Camp, “With My Own Two Hands” to benefit children of Comfort Zone Camp – Richmond, VirginiaOctober: “Art Transforming Lives” Child Savers group show at Glave Kocen Gallery –Richmond, Virginia
October: Child Savers Permanent Collection, Child Savers Gallery – Richmond, Virginia

2015 
October: Child Savers Permanent Collection, Child Savers Gallery – Richmond, Virginia
October: “Art Transforming Lives” Child Savers group show at Glave Kocen Gallery –Richmond, Virginia
March: Comfort Zone Camp, “Grief Relief Gala” to benefit children of Comfort Zone Camp – Richmond, Virginia
January: “The Jerusalem Series” Sara D. November Gallery – Richmond, Virginia

2014 
December: “The Jerusalem Series” Sara D. November Gallery – Richmond, Virginia
May: “Heroes Art Ball” benefit group show to support Connor’s Heroes – Richmond, Virginia
March: Comfort Zone Camp, “Grief Relief Gala” to benefit children of Comfort Zone Camp – Richmond, Virginia
January: “Small Works Show” group show at Glave Kocen Gallery – Richmond, Virginia

2013 
March: “Cheers to Art,” Lewis Ginter Botanical Gardens – Massey Auditorium – Richmond, Virginia

2012 
January: “Small Works Show” group show at Glave Kocen Gallery – Richmond, Virginia

2011 
May: “Tradition with a twist” group show at smART Gallery – Williamsburg, Virginia 
May: “The Billboard Art Project” – Savannah, Georgia March: “Cheers to Art,” Lewis Ginter Botanical Gardens – Massey Auditorium – Richmond, Virginia 
February – June: Turchin Center for the Visual Arts – Boone, North Carolina January: “Artists Helping Artists” – Gallery 5800 – Richmond, Virginia

2010 
November: Ballad of Nanny Fluff – London, U.K. 
October: Group exhibition featuring Joshua Barber, Andre Lucero and Ed Hatch – Gallery 5800 – Richmond, Virginia 
July: “Wooden and Paper Icons,” The Arts Council of the Valley – The Smith House – Harrisonburg, Virginia 
April: “Cheers to Art,” Lewis Ginter Botanical Gardens – Massey Auditorium – Richmond, Virginia 
April: Dreweatts Urban Contemporary Auction – London, U.K.

2009 
December: “Advent” group show at 2 Degrees Gallery – Bristol, U.K. 
October: “Get Dring Mobile: Urban Art Auction” group show at Paintworks, Bath Road – Bristol, U.K. 
October: “Barber vs Barber,” a collection of 50 paintings with father and maritime artist John M. Barber at Gallery 5800 – Richmond, Virginia
August: “Art in Mind” group exhibit at the Brick Lane Gallery – London, U.K. 
August: “A good-old fight that stands between me and the law” solo exhibit at the Knifesmith Gallery – Bristol, U.K. 
March: “The Inaugural Show” group exhibit at Art Raw Gallery – New York, New York 
June: “The Sketchbook Project” at Art House Gallery, Atlanta; Museum of Contemporary Art DC, Washington, D.C.; Laconia Gallery, Boston; Antena Gallery, Chicago; Soulard Art Market, St. Louis, MO; 3rd Ward, Brooklyn; Museum of Design Atlanta (MODA), Atlanta; Chicago Art Source Gallery, Chicago

2008 
December: “Piazza Napoleone – Lucca” selected for the Virginia Museum of Fine Arts’ “Art After Hours” invitational exhibition and auction – Richmond, Virginia 
November: “Art Knows No Borders” group exhibit and auction to benefit Doctors Without Borders – Los Angeles, California September: “Art180″ – Richmond, Virginia

2007 
October: “Modern Icons” solo show at the Rainbow Café – Bristol, U.K. 
January: “Are we there yet” selected for the Virginia Museum of Fine Arts’ “Art after Hours” invitational exhibition and auction – Richmond, Virginia

2006 
December: Painting selected for charity auction at Art Works to benefit Art 180, a nonprofit that offers arts programs to young people living in challenging circumstances – Richmond, Virginia 
February: “We walk not upon a line” selected for the Virginia Museum of Fine Arts’ “Art After Hours” invitational exhibition and auction – Richmond, Virginia 
January: Three paintings from “Five Books” awarded second place overall in a juried show at Art Works – Richmond, Virginia

2005 
May: “Five Books” solo show held in private space – Richmond, Virginia
2003 
March: “Balance” solo show at the Barber Gallery – Richmond, Virginia

Bibliography and Features 

Warscapes, New York City, New York

RVA Magazine, Richmond, Virginia

Gawker Artists, New York City, New York

Metro.co.uk, South East England

Ballad Of, London, England

Holyghost, London, England

Cerise Press, United States, France

Peripheral Arteries, Rome, Italy

Richmond Times-Dispatch, Richmond, Virginia

Red Door Magazine, New York City, New York

Hautstyle, Newcastle, England

Papergirl Dublin, Dublin, Ireland

Ponshop, Fredericksburg, Virginia

Kerosene & Things, Montreal, Canada

Skull-A-Day, Richmond, Virginia

Fredericksburg.com, Fredericksburg, Virginia

Blisstree, Toronto, Ontario

Style Weekly, Richmond, Virginia

Please Hold Magazine, St. Louis, Missouri

References

External links 

1977 births
Artists from Richmond, Virginia
Living people